The first Charles Powell Leslie (1731–1800), known also as Charles Powell Leslie I, was the son of Robert and Frances (née Rogerson) Leslie, daughter of Sir John Rogerson (1676-1741), Lord Chief Justice of Ireland. He was member of the Irish Parliament for Hillsborough (1771–1776) and Monaghan County (1783–1800). In 1765 he married Prudence Penelope, daughter of Arthur Hill-Trevor, 1st Viscount Dungannon. His children from this marriage included Charles Powell (II) and John. In 1785 he married Mary Anne (née Tench) with whom he had one son and four daughters. He lived at Glaslough.

References

Further reading

1731 births
1800 deaths
Irish MPs 1769–1776
Irish MPs 1783–1790
Irish MPs 1790–1797
Irish MPs 1798–1800
Members of the Parliament of Ireland (pre-1801) for County Down constituencies
Members of the Parliament of Ireland (pre-1801) for County Monaghan constituencies